Soul Jazz Records is a British record label based in London. Outside of releasing records, the label also publishes books, occasionally films and performs as a DJ set. The music releases labels from a variety of genres, including reggae, house, hip hop, punk rock, jazz, funk, bossa nova and soul.

History 
Soul Jazz Records was founded by Stuart Baker in 1991. Baker purchased his first record at the age of 10 and prior to starting the label, had his roots selling records at a secondhand record vinyl stall in the Camden market in the late 1980s.

The label initially worked doing straight reissues of old albums before releasing Nu Yorica!, a double album of classic salsa and Latin funk from the 1970s. Peter Reilly spoke on the labels behalf that Nu Yorica was their first "really successful record" form Soul Jazz noting that "it was more of a kind of cult thing up until then. It opened it up to a lot of people." and that the album sold specifically well in New York.

The reggae releases were praised by important people of the genre, such as Chris Blackwell of Island records who called the It's Dynamite! compilations as the "university of reggae." Radio 1's Gilles Peterson commented that "Soul Jazz put out the best compilations. They've consistently done it, from the Studio One stuff to the free jazz stuff to the acid house compilations. As a reissue label, they're the best."
Grant Marshall of Massive Attack stated that one thing he wanted to do when entering the music business was to release Studio One records in England and tried to deal with the Coxsone Dodd of Studio One. Baker managed to talk to Dodd to let him have access to their archives after Dodd had put out rare jazz compilations. Dodd died in 2004 leading to the labels relationship to continue via his daughter Carol and his wife Norma Dodd, who died in 2010. These deaths briefly led to breaks in releasing Studio One related material.

The booklets of Soul Jazz Records album are often written by Baker himself, with Baker explaining that he likes to describe the relationships between music and society, the connections between genres, and the history of the music industry.

Soul Jazz has released album through sublabels. These include Universal Sound, which was described by the Soul Jazz website as both a sister label and a subsidiary label. Soul Jazz described Universal Sound as containing "releases that are slightly more specialist. Mainly artist releases rather than compilations they often follow on from an earlier Soul Jazz Release. Many of these releases come with extensive sleeve notes and original photos." Another was Satellite Records, which was a label home to bands such as Add N to X, Sand, Bell, and Yossarian.

Discography

Albums

Compilations 
SJR8 London Jazz Classics
SJR17 London Jazz Classics 2
SJR19 Soul Jazz Love Strata-East
SJR22 Brasil
SJR26 London Jazz Classics 3
SJR27 Universal Sounds of America
SJR29 Nu Yorica!
SJR34 Faith: A Message From The Spirits
SJR36 Nu Yorica 2!
SJR37 Batucada Capoeira
SJR39 Chicano Power!
SJR40 100% Dynamite!
SJR41 200% Dynamite!
SJR42 Barrio Nuevo
SJR43 300% Dynamite!
SJR45 Nu Yorica Roots!
SJR46 400% Dynamite!
SJR47 New Orleans Funk
SJR48 Studio One Rockers
SJR49 Philadelphia Roots
SJR50 Studio One Soul
SJR53 Saturday Night Fish Fry: New Orleans Funk and Soul
SJR55 500% Dynamite!
SJR56 Studio One Roots
SJR57 In the Beginning There Was Rhythm
SJR58 Studio One DJ's
SJR66 Hustle! Reggae Disco
SJR67 Studio One Scorcher
SJR68 Studio One Story
SJR72 Miami Sound
SJR74 Nice Up the Dance
SJR77 New York Noise
SJR82 British Hustle
SJR84 600% Dynamite!
SJR85 Studio One Ska
SJR87 Studio One Musik City
SJR89 Studio One Dub
SJR93 Chicago Soul
SJR96 Studio One Classics
SJR97 Studio One Funk
SJR98 The Sound of Philadelphia
SJR100 The Gallery
SJR102 Studio One Disco Mix
SJR103 Studio One Disco Mix
SJR107 Soul Gospel
SJR110 New Thing!
SJR111 Acid: Can You Jack?
SJR112 The Sexual Life of the Savages
SJR114 Studio One Roots 2
SJR115 Microsolutions #1
SJR116 Studio One Lovers
SJR118 Tropicália: A Brazilian Revolution in Sound
SJR121 Studio One Women
SJR125 Big Apple Rappin': The Early Days of Hip-Hop Culture in New York City 1979–1982'''
SJR126 New York Noise Vol. 2SJR128 Studio One Soul 2SJR129 Soul Gospel Vol. 2SJR137 Studio One DJ's 2SJR143 Studio One Scorcher 2SJR144 Cinco Anos Despue (5 Years On)SJR146 Dynamite! Dancehall StyleSJR147 New York Noise Vol. 3SJR148 Studio One Rude BoySJR151 Studio One GroupsSJR153 Do It YourselfSJR154 Studio One Rub-a-dubSJR156 Studio One KingsSJR158 New York Latin Hustle!SJR159 Rumble in the JungleSJR161 Box of Dub — Dubstep and Future DubSJR162 Drums of Cuba — Afro-Cuban Music From the RootsSJR164 Brazil 70 – After TropicaliaSJR166 Studio One Dub Vol. 2SJR168 Studio One Roots Vol. 3SJR170 Soul Jazz Records Singles 2006–2007SJR171 Jamaica Funk — Original Jamaican Soul and Funk 45'sSJR172 Box of Dub 2 – Dubstep and Future DubSJR177 An England StorySJR178 Steppas' Delight — Dubstep Present to FutureSJR185 New Orleans Funk Vol.2SJR194 Soul Jazz Records Singles 2008–2009SJR196 Dancehall — The Rise of Jamaican Dancehall CultureSJR201 Dub EchoesSJR202 Subway – Subway IISJR204 100% Dynamite! NYC: Dancehall Reggae Meets Rap In New York CitySJR206 Fly GirlsSJR213 Deutsche Elektronische MusikSJR214 Can You Dig It? The Music And Politics Of Black Action Films 1968–75SJR219 Freedom, Rhythm & Sound – Revolutionary Jazz & The Civil Rights Movement 1963–82SJR222 Steppas' Delight 2SJR223 Dancehall 2 (The Rise Of Jamaican Dancehall Culture)SJR226 135 Grand Street New York 1979SJR229 Riddim Box – Excursions In The UK Funky UndergroundSJR230 Rara In HaitiSJR234 Future BassSJR236 Invasion Of The Mysteron Killer SoundsSJR239 Bossa Nova And The Rise Of Brazilian Music In The 1960sSJR242 Brazil Bossa Beat ! Bossa Nova And The Story Of Elenco Records, BrazilSJR243 Delta Swamp Rock – Sounds From The SouthSJR244 The Black Caribs Of BelizeSJR245 Bossa Jazz: The Birth Of Hard Bossa, Samba Jazz And The Evolution Of Brazilian Fusion 1962–73SJR248 The Legendary Studio One RecordsSJR253 Harmony, Melody & Style – Lovers Rock In The UK 1975–1992SJR254 Jende Ri Palenge – People Of PalenqueSJR255 Voguing And The House Ballroom Scene Of New York City 1976–96SJR256 Studio One SoundSJR257 TV Sound And Image (British Television, Film And Library Composers 1956–80)SJR258 Country Soul SistersSJR259 Delta Swamp Rock Volume 2 – More Sounds From The SouthSJR260 Studio One IronsidesSJR263 Mirror To The Soul: Caribbean Jump-Up, Mambo & Calypso Beat 1954–77SJR265 Deutsche Elektronische Musik 2SJR266 Acid – Mysterons Invade The Jackin' ZoneSJR267 Country Soul Sisters Vol.2SJR268 New Orleans Funk Vol.3SJR269 New Orleans SoulSJR270 Inner City Beat! - Detective Themes, Spy Music And Imaginary ThrillersSJR271 Studio One Ska Fever! More Ska Sounds From Sir Coxsone's Downbeat 1962–65SJR272 Punk 45: Kill The Hippies! Kill Yourself! The American Nation Destroys Its Young, Vol. 1SJR274 Calypso: Musical Poetry In The Caribbean 1955–69SJR275 Gipsy RhumbaSJR277 Studio One RocksteadySJR278 Punk 45: There Is No Such Thing As Society. Get a Job, Get a Car, Get a Bed, Get Drunk!, Vol. 2SJR279 Punk 45: Sick On You! One Way Spit! After the Love & Before the Revolution, Vol. 3SJR281 Studio One Dancehall – Sir Coxsone in the Dance: The Foundation SoundSJR286 No Seattle: Forgotten Sounds of the North-West Grunge Era 1986–97SJR287 Gwo Ka: Music of Guadeloupe, West IndiesSJR288 Black Fire! New Spirits: Radical And Revolutionary Jazz In The U.S.A 1957–82SJR289 Disco: A Fine Selection of Independent Disco, Modern Soul and Boogie 1978–82SJR290 Degrees of Shade: Hot Jump-Up Island Sounds from the CaribbeanSJR296 Studio One Jump-UpSJR299 Punk 45: Burn, Rubber City, Burn – Akron, Ohio: Punk and the Decline of the Mid-West 1975–80SJR300 Punk 45: Extermination Nights In The Sixth City! Cleveland, Ohio: Punk And The Decline Of The Mid West 1975 – 82SJR307 Sounds of the Universe: Art + Sound 2012–15, Vol. 1SJR309 Nu Yorica! (Reissue, Remastered)SJR311 Disco 2: A Further Fine Selection of Independent Disco, Modern Soul and Boogie 1976–80SJR312 Rastafari: The Dreads Enter Babylon 1955–83SJR321 100% Dynamite! (Reissue)SJR323 Coxsone's Music: The First Recordings Of Sir Coxsone The Downbeat 1960–62SJR324 Studio One Dub Fire SpecialSJR326 Studio One Showcase: The Sound Of Studio One In The 1970sSJR327 New Orleans FunkSJR328 New York Noise (Reissue)SJR329 Punk 45: Chaos In The City Of Angels And Devils – Punk In Los Angeles 1977–81SJR332 Coxsone's Music 2: The Sound Of Young JamaicaSJR334 Boombox 1: Early Independent Hip Hop, Electro, And Disco Rap 1979–82SJR335 Venezuela 70 – Cosmic Visions Of A Latin American EarthSJR341 Nigeria Freedom Sounds!SJR344 Nigeria Soul FeverSJR354 Punk 45: Les Punks – The French ConnectionSJR355 New Orleans Funk Vol.4SJR367 Studio One Rocksteady Vol.2SJR368 Hustle! Reggae Disco (Reissue, Expanded)SJR370 Boombox 2: Early Independent Hip Hop, Electro, And Disco Rap 1979–82SJR371 Vodou Drums In Haiti 2SJR377 Studio One Hi-Fi SpecialSJR378 Soul 70SJR 379 Nigeria Soul Power 70SJR392 Space, Energy & Light – Experimental Electronic And Acoustic Soundscapes 1961–88SJR393 Soul Of A Nation: Afro-Centric Visions in the Age of Black PowerSJR396 Studio One Supreme: Maximum 70s & 80s Early Dancehall SoundsSJR398 Black Man's PrideSJR399 Yoruba! - Songs & Rhythms For The Yoruba Gods In NigeriaSJR401 Dancehall (2017 Edition Reissue): The Rise Of Jamaican Dancehall CultureSJR402 Deutsche Elektronische Musik 3SJR405 Brasil (Reissue, Remastered)SJR406 Studio One Records Dub Plate Special Box SetSJR407 Congo Revolution: African Latin, Jazz And Funk Sounds From The Two Congos (1957–73) SJR408 Punk 45: Approaching The Minimal With Spray GunsSJR409 Deutsche Elektronische Musik (2018 Edition Reissue)SJR411 Boombox 3: Early Independent Hip Hop, Electro, And Disco Rap 1979–83SJR414 Black Man's Pride 2 (Righteous Are The Sons And Daughters Of Jah) SJR415 Studio One Freedom Sounds (Studio One In The 1960s)SJR419 Venezuela 70 Volume 2 (Cosmic Visions Of A Latin American Earth: Venezuelan Experimental Rock In The 1970's & Beyond)SJR421 Black Man's Pride 3 (None Shall Escape The Judgement Of The Almighty)SJR422 Studio One Lovers RockSJR423 Soul Of A Nation 2 (Jazz Is The Teacher Funk Is The Preacher: Afro-Centric Jazz, Street Funk And The Roots Of Rap In The Black Power Era 1969–75)SJR424 Black Man's Pride 2SJR428 Brazil USA 70 (Brazilian Music In The USA In The 1970s)SJR437 Congo Revolution (Revolutionary And Evolutionary Sounds From The Two Congos 1955–62)SJR438 Studio One Showcase 45SJR439 Boombox 45 (Early Independent Hip Hop, Electro And Disco Rap 1979–82)SJR440 APALA: Apala Groups In Nigeria 1967–70SJR443 Style & Fashion (A-Class Top Notch Hi Fi Sounds In Fine Style)SJR445 Studio One DJ PartySJR446 Nigeria Soul Power 70 (Afro-Funk ★ Afro-Rock ★ Afro-Disco)SJR449 Space Funk (Afro Futurist Electro Funk In Space 1976–84)SJR450 Studio One 007 – Licensed To SkaSJR452 Black Riot (Early Jungle, Rave And Hardcore)SJR454 Brazil Funk PowerSJR455 Kaleidoscope (New Spirits Known & Unknown)SJR461 Cuba Music And Revolution Experiments In Latin Music 1975–85 Vol.1SJR462 Two Synths A Guitar (And) A Drum MachineSJR464 Rocksteady Got Soul Re-releases 

SJR20 Jessica Lauren – Siren SongSJR23 Esperanto – EsperantoSJR32  Chris Bowden – Time CapsuleSJR38 Grupo Oba-Ilu – SanteriaSJR52 Osunlade – ParadigmSJR59 Sandoz – Chant To JahSJR60 A Certain Ratio – EarlySJR62 Mantronix – That's My BeatSJR64 ESG – Step OffSJR65 A Certain Ratio – B-Sides, Sessions & RaritiesSJR76 Joe Gibbs – Joe Gibbs ProductionsSJR80 Jackie Mittoo and The Soul Brothers – Last Train To SkavilleSJR83 Arthur Russell – The World of Arthur RussellSJR88 Hu Vibrational – BeautifulSJR90 Konk – The Story of KonkSJR91 Ammon Contact – Beat Tape RemixesSJR94 Bell – Seven Types of SixSJR101 Burning Spear – Sounds from the Burning SpearSJR104 Sugar Minott – Sugar Minott at Studio OneSJR113 Mark Stewart – Kiss the FutureSJR117 Mercenárias – The Beginning of the End of the WorldSJR120 Tom Moulton – A Tom Moulton MixSJR122 Steve Reid Ensemble – Spirit WalkSJR105 Spirits of Life – Haitian VodouSJR127 Sound Dimension – Jamaica Soul Shake Vol. 1SJR130 Sandoz – Live in the EarthSJR132 Rekid – Made in MenorcaSJR133 The Sisters Love – Give Me Your LoveSJR136 Tumba Francesa – Afro-Cuban Music from the RootsSJR138 ESG – Keep On MovingSJR139 Hu Vibrational – Universal MotherSJR140 Sand – The Dalston ShroudSJR150 ESG – Come Away With...SJR167 ESG – A South Bronx Story 2 – Collector's Edition: RaritiesSJR173 Sound Dimension – Mojo Rocksteady BeatSJR186  Tetine – LET YOUR X'S BE Y'SSJR188 Secondo – A Matter of ScaleSJR190 Ragga Twins – Ragga Twins Step OutSJR191 Art Ensemble Of Chicago – Les Stances A Sophie – A Motion Picture SoundtrackSJR246 The Lijadu Sisters – Afro-beat Soul SistersSJR302 Popol Vuh – KailashSJR322 Hieroglyphic Being – The Acid DocumentsSJR325 Count Ossie & The Mystic Revelation Of Rastafari – Tales of MozambiqueSJR331 Count Ossie & The Rasta Family – Man From Higher HeightsSJR333 Africans With Mainframes (Hieroglyphic Being & Noleian Reusse) – K.M.T.SJR345 Betty Harris – The Lost Queen Of New Orleans SoulSJR346 Tee Mac – Night IllusionSJR369 Laraaji – Celestial Vibration (Reissue)SJR373 Lloyd McNeill Quartet – Asha (Reissue)SJR374 Lloyd McNeill Quartet – Washington SuiteSJR375 The Skatalites – Independence Ska And The Far East SoundSJR394 Hierogyphic Being – The Red NotesSJR412 Nigeria Fuji Machine – Synchro Sound System & Power''

References

Sources

External links 
 Official website

British record labels